Dr. Stan's Prescription, Volume 2 is a limited edition, live archival recording by the American rock band moe.  Chosen by band archivist Dr. Stan Lobitz, it chronicles the first night of the second annual moe.down in Turin, New York on August 31, 2001.  It was released on February 10, 2009.

Track listing
Disc one
 "Intro"
 "Moth"
 "Lazarus"
 "Bring You Down"
 "Brent Black"
Disc two
 "Bass Jam"
 "St. Augustine"
 "Time Ed"
 "Moth"
 "Banter"
 "(Don't Fear) The Reaper"

Personnel
moe.
Vinnie Amico – drums
Rob Derhak – bass, vocals
Chuck Garvey – guitar, vocals
Jim Loughlin – percussion
Al Schnier – guitar, keyboards, vocals
Production
Produced by moe.
Archived by Dr. Stan Lobitz

References

2009 live albums
Moe (band) live albums